Tyranna may refer to:

 Tirana, the capital city of Albania
 Tyranna Resources, an Australian company